The Congo peafowl (Afropavo congensis), also known as the African peafowl or mbulu by the Bakôngo, is a species of peafowl native to the Congo Basin. It is one of three peafowl species and the only member of the subfamily Pavoninae native to Africa. It is listed as Near Threatened on the IUCN Red List.

History
Dr. Chapin noticed that the native Congolese headdresses contained long reddish-brown feathers that he could not identify with any previously known species of bird. Later, Chapin visited the Royal Museum of Central Africa and saw two stuffed specimens with similar feathers labeled as the 'Indian peacock' which he later discovered to be the Congo peafowl, a completely different species. In 1955 Chapin managed to find seven specimens of the species. The Congo peafowl has physical characteristics of both the peafowl and the guineafowl, which may indicate that the species is a link between the two families.

Description 

Though much less impressive than its Asiatic cousins, the male's feathers are nevertheless deep blue with a metallic green and violet tinge. It has bare red neck skin, grey feet, and a black tail with fourteen tail feathers. Its crown is adorned with vertical white elongated hair-like feathers. Both sexes resemble immature Asian peafowl, with early stuffed birds being erroneously classified as such before they were officially designated as members of a unique species.

Distribution and habitat
The Congo peafowl inhabits and is endemic to the Central Congolian lowland forests of the Democratic Republic of the Congo where it has also been designated the national bird. It occurs in both primary and secondary forest in Salonga National Park. Secondary signs of its presence like droppings and feathers were more frequently encountered in regenerating secondary forest than in primary forest. In secondary forest, its droppings were found close to watercourses, where trees were smaller and plant diversity lower than in primary forest.

In the 1990s, it was recorded in Maiko National Park, foremost in low hills and ridges between watersheds.

Behaviour and ecology
The Congo peafowl is an omnivore with a diet consisting mainly of fruits and insects. In Salonga National Park, its diet includes fruits from Allanblackia floribunda, junglesop, Canarium schweinfurthii, oil palm, Klainedoxa gabonensis, African breadfruit, and Xylopia aethiopica and a multitude of insects, spiders, mollusks and worms.

In Salonga National Park, its diet is taxonomically narrower in secondary forest than in primary forest. The male has a similar display to that of other species of peafowl, though the Congo peacock actually fans its tail feathers while other peacocks fan their upper tail covert feathers. The Congo peafowl is monogamous, though detailed mating information from the wild is still needed. The peacock of the species has a high-pitched "gowe" calling noise while the peahen emits a low "gowah". They have loud duets consisting of "rro-ho-ho-o-a" from both sexes.

Threats 
The Congo peafowl is threatened by habitat loss caused by mining, shifting cultivation and logging.

Conservation

The Congo peafowl is listed as near threatened on the IUCN Red List. As of 2013, the wild population was estimated at between 2,500 and 9,000 adult individuals.
Given its use of regenerating forest in Salonga National Park, secondary forests might be an important habitat to include in a conservation strategy.

Captive breeding programs were initiated in the Belgian Antwerp Zoo and at Salonga National Park.

In popular culture 
In the 1999 Patrick O'Brian novel Blue at the Mizzen, set shortly after the conclusion of the Napoleonic Wars, Dr. Stephen Maturin is interested to learn of the rumored existence of the Congo peafowl (to which he refers as the "Congo peacock") from a naturalist friend in Sierra Leone.

References

External links 

 Images and movies of the Congo Peacock (Afropavo congensis)— ARKive
 BirdLife Species Factsheet
 Congo Peacock (Afropavo congensis)—gbwf.org
 Kimball, R.T, Braun, E.L. and J. D. Ligon (1997). "Resolution of the phylogenetic position of the Congo Peafowl, Afropavo congensis: a biogeographic and evolutionary enigma". Proc. R. Soc. Lond. B 264:1517–1523

Congo peafowl
Pavonini
Birds of Central Africa
Endemic birds of the Democratic Republic of the Congo
Congo peafowl
Congo peafowl